Halisarcidae is a family of sea sponges within the order Chondrillida. Members of the family are characterised by having long tubular, branched choanocyte chambers; they have no spicules which makes it difficult to determine the group's affinities with other sponge families. Halisarcidae is a monogeneric family, the only genus being Halisarca.

See also
Halisarca caerulea

References

Demospongiae